Lithuanian Biathlon Federation is a national governing body of biathlon sport in Lithuania.

Federation also organising annual national Lithuanian Biathlon Championships.

Structure 
As of 2021:
 President: Arūnas Daugirdas
 General Secretary: Ričardas Griaznovas

References

External links 
Official website

Biathlon
1995 establishments in Lithuania
Sports organizations established in 1995
Biathlon organizations
Biathlon in Lithuania